The 1967–68 National Football League was the 37th staging of the National Football League (NFL), an annual Gaelic football tournament for the Gaelic Athletic Association county teams of Ireland.

Down defeated Kildare in the final.

Format

Divisions
 Division One: 8 teams. Split into two groups of 4.
 Division Two: 8 teams. Split into two groups of 4.
 Division Three: 8 teams. Split into two groups of 4. 
 Division Four: 8 teams. Split into two groups of 4.

The top 2 in each group progressed to the Division Semi-finals. The winners of the Division Finals played off in the NFL semi-finals.

Round-robin format
Single Round-Robin. Each team played every other team in its division (or group where the division is split) once, either home or away.

Division One (A) was to be played as a double round-robin, but this was abandoned.

Points awarded
2 points were awarded for a win and 1 for a draw.

Titles
Teams in all four divisions competed for the National Football League title.

League Phase Results and Tables

Division One

Division One (A) regulation games

Division One (A) play-offs

Division One (B) regulation games

Division One inter-group play-offs

Division One (A) table

Division One (B) table

Division Two

Division Two (A) play-offs

Division Two (B) play-offs

Division Two inter-group play-offs

Division Two (A) table

Division Two (B) table

Division Three

Division Three (B) regulation games

Division Three (B) play-offs

Division Three inter-group play-offs

Division Three (A) table

Division Three (B) table

Division Four

Division Four (A) regulation games

Division Four (B) regulation games

Division Four inter-group play-offs

Division Four (A) table

Division Four (B) table

Knockout Phase Results

Semi-final

Final

References

National Football League
National Football League
National Football League (Ireland) seasons